The Soviet Figure Skating Championships were a figure skating national championship held annually to determine the national champions of the Soviet Union. Skaters competed in the disciplines of men's singles, ladies' singles, pair skating, and ice dancing.

These championships were last held in 1992 after the dissolution of the Soviet Union in 1991.

Medalists

Men

Ladies

Pairs

Ice dancing

Sources
 Results 1991:Pirouette, 25. Jahrgang, January 1991, Nummer 1, Page 16
 Results 1991:Pirouette, 26. Jahrgang, January 1992, Nummer 1, Page 17/18

External links
 Pairs on Ice Pair skating results
 Moscow Stars on Ice

 
Figure skating national championships
Figure skating in the Soviet Union
Figure skating